The Forest Route 157–Tamarack River Bridge, also known as the San Souci Bridge, was a bridge located on Federal Forest Highway 157 over the Tamarack River in Stambaugh Township, Michigan. It was listed on the National Register of Historic Places in 1999, and demolished in the late 2000s.

History

During the 1910s, a road was developed through Iron County running from Dickinson County through Crystal Falls and Iron River and on to Gogebic County. Between Iron River and the county line, the road crossed three rivers: Cook's Run River, the Paint River and the Tamarack River. In 1915 the Michigan State Highway Department let out contracts to construct  spans over each river; these bridges were designated Trunk Line Bridges 26, 27, and 28, respectively. Barnum and Counihan were awarded the contracts to build the bridges at Cook's Run and over the Tamarack River. The Tamarack River bridge was completed in 1916 at a cost of $2,826.10..

The bridge was the last link in the trunk line route—then known as the "Cloverland Trail"—and on July 21, 1916 was the site of the formal dedication of the route. It was located near the Sans Souci flag railroad station on a Chicago and North Western line. 1,500 people took part, although many of them were forced to arrive by train, alongside about 270 automobiles and motorcars. Food included  of meat.

In the 1920s the Cloverland Trail developed into US Highway 2, but by 1942 the segment crossing the Tamarack River had been realigned, and the old section re-designated as a Forest Road in the Ottawa National Forest. The Forest Route 157–Tamarack River Bridge carried vehicular traffic, and was in essentially unaltered condition until its demolition in the late 2000s. The bridge was technologically significant as one of the two oldest concrete girder bridges designed by the Michigan State Highway Department.

Description
The bridge represented a standard 1915–16 Michigan State Highway Department design. The bridge consisted of two concrete girders resting on concrete abutments with angled wingwalls. The bridge was modestly detailed, with recessed rectangular panels on the outside walls and bronze "Trunk Line Bridge" plates (since removed) on the girders' inside walls.

See also

References

Further reading 
New Highway Opened
Route 675
Cloverland Trail Completed

External links
NRHP listing at the National Archives

Road bridges on the National Register of Historic Places in Michigan
Bridges completed in 1916
Buildings and structures in Iron County, Michigan
National Register of Historic Places in Iron County, Michigan
Concrete bridges in the United States
Girder bridges in the United States